Serapicos may refer to the following places in Portugal:

Serapicos (Bragança), a parish in the municipality of Bragança
Serapicos (Valpaços), a parish in the municipality of Valpaços